Il tenente dei carabinieri (The lieutenant of Carabinieri) is a 1986 Italian crime-comedy film directed by Maurizio Ponzi.

Plot
The Lieutenant of carabinieri Duilio Cordelli often quarrels with his Commander Colonel Vinci. When the two must investigate two murders suspect, Duilio discovers that a gang of thieves plan to cover a major bank heist in Rome with a traffic of counterfeit notes.

Cast 
 Enrico Montesano: Lt. Duilio Cordelli 
 Nino Manfredi: Colonel Vinci
 Massimo Boldi: Brigadier Nautico Lodifè
 Marisa Laurito: Wife of Cordelli
 Mattia Sbragia: Domenico Vasaturo
 Nuccia Fumo: Mother of Cordelli
 Bruno Corazzari: Augusto Lorenzini

References

External links

1986 films
1980s crime comedy films
Films directed by Maurizio Ponzi
Films scored by Bruno Zambrini
Italian crime comedy films
1986 comedy films
1980s Italian films